Dave Maclean (born José Carlos González, September 29, 1944, São Paulo, Brazil) is a Brazilian singer-songwriter, whose repertoire sung in English was very successful in the 1970s.

Biography
Born in Brazil to a Spanish father, Santan Dave became interested in singing and playing at the age of five. In 1969, he started a band named "Os Botões" in the ABC Region, in the Greater São Paulo. The band had its name anglicized later, becoming "The Buttons". In 1973, Som Livre, a subsidiary of Rede Globo, made a proposal for Dave to record songs in English, so they could become part of soap opera soundtracks. At that time, being featured in the television shows with the highest audience across all TV channels in the country, would push sales of any records related to those programs. Because of that, Dave became a very popular artist in Brazil.

1970s
Dave scored several hits, such as "Me and You," (the theme song for the soap opera "Os Ossos do "Barão"),
"We Said Goodbye", "Tears" (also recorded by Chrystian, a Brazilian singer), and "Feelings" (an international hit by Morris Albert). "We said Goodbye" was a resounding success, and received Gold Records both in Brazil and Mexico. In Mexico, Dave did a remarkable job of putting four hits within the top ten. The singer also had recognition in countries like Philippines, Ecuador, Panama, Portugal, United States, Spain, France and England.

1980s and 1990s
In 1980, the rush of Brazilian singers recording in English had slowed down. Dave invites the Munhoz brothers to form the trio "Dollar Company", which remained for more than 15 years. In 1996, Dave took a new direction to his music career, and set up a new band: "Montana Country", taking advantage of a new wave to modernize American country music.

Composer
As a composer of sertanejo music, his works in Portuguese became known through artists like Gian and Giovani (Mil Corações), Sérgio Reis (Palavras de Amor e Na Outra Mão), Sula Miranda (Fogo e Palha), Sandy & Junior (Pra Dançar com Você e Ser Criança), Nalva Aguiar (Cowboy de Rodeio), among others. Dave also participated in the recordings of other artists, exponents of national music, such as: Zezé Di Camargo & Luciano, Leandro e Leonardo, Edson and Hudson, Amado Batista, Joanna, Sérgio Reis, Sula Miranda, Willie Nelson, Duduca e Dalvan, Marlon e Maycon, among others.

2010s
Dave is currently performing with "The 70's International Sound," singing songs of Bee Gees, Elton John, Johnny Rivers and The Beatles. He also performs in the "Hits Again" show, playing his old hits and his 1970s best contemporaries such as Paul Denver, Steve Maclean, Pholhas, and others.

Discography

Os Botões

 1969 - Os Botões 
 1969 - Os Botões

Albums

 1973 - Me And You
 1974 – Dave Maclean
 1975 – Dave Maclean
 1976 – For All The Children
 1976 – Y Así Quedé en Soledad
 2001 - Dave Maclean Hearts In Love
 2001 - Dave Maclean Ao Vivo

Singles and EPs

 1973 - Me And You/Like A Rainbow
 1973 - To Be In Love With You/Changin' My Life
 1974 – We Said Goodbye/Now I Know
 1974 - We Said Goodbye
 1974 - We Said Goodbye/Rain And Memories
 1975 - We Said Goodbye/Feelings
 1975 - I'm Going Away/You
 1975 – We Said Goodbye/Do You Wanna Dance
 1976 – Nos Dijimos Adios/Lagrimas En Mi Rostro
 1975 - Solitaire / Chance Of Love
 1975 - Solitaire
 1976 - Nos Dijimos Adios/Tan Solo Por Amor
 1976 - I Don't Care/I'll Come Back
 1976 - I Don't Care/Rhythm Of The Rain
 Unknown - Sentimientos/Change Of Love

Dollar Company

 1981 – Dollar Co
 1981 – Dollar Co 2

Montana Country

 1996 – Montana Country
 1997 – Montana Country 2
 1999 – Montana Country Country Beatles
 2000 – Montana Country

References

External links
 http://www.davemaclean.com.br
 Dave Maclean - Discogs

1944 births
Living people
Brazilian people of Spanish descent
20th-century Brazilian male singers
20th-century Brazilian singers
Brazilian songwriters
English-language singers from Brazil
Singers from São Paulo